Boris Katalymov ( or Katalimov; 13 June 1932 – 1 February 2013) was a Soviet and later Kazakhstani chess player. He was awarded the title of International Master by FIDE in 1996. Katalymov was multiple times champion of Kazakhstan. He took the silver medal in the 1995 World Senior Chess Championship, held in Bad Liebenzell, Germany.
The Katalymov Variation of the Sicilian Defence is named after him.. Boris Nikolaevich spent his later years teaching chess to young children and teenagers at the 'School Palace' in Almaty, Kazakhstan.

References

External links
 
 
 

1932 births
2013 deaths
Kazakhstani chess players
Soviet chess players
Chess International Masters